Hélio César Rosas (24 March 1929 – 8 February 2022) was a Brazilian politician.

A member of the Brazilian Democratic Movement, he served in the Chamber of Deputies from 1987 to 1999. He died on 8 February 2022, at the age of 92.

References

1929 births
2022 deaths
20th-century Brazilian politicians
Members of the Chamber of Deputies (Brazil) from São Paulo
Brazilian Democratic Movement politicians
People from Pindamonhangaba